Greg Evans (born 17 April 1953) is an Australian radio and television presenter, currently based in Melbourne. He is also a popular marriage celebrant, continuing on from his hosting of the matchmaking television game show, Perfect Match Australia in the 1980s.

Career

Radio 
Evans was born in Melbourne, Victoria. At the beginning of his career he worked on regional radio stations 3CV in Maryborough and 3CS in Colac hosting afternoon and breakfast programs respectively. In the 1970s he was the highly popular host of the drive time slot of radio station 3XY, with his program being the number one rated show in 27 of the 28 ratings surveys taken. He was nominated three times for a Gold Logie award. In 1975 he was awarded Most Popular Radio DJ in Victoria at the TV Week King of Pop Awards, and went on to win the award six times. In 1984 he joined Gold 104.3. from 1994 to 1996 at the station, he hosted Drive (3pm-7pm). 1996–1998 saw him co-host Gold's breakfast program with Dermott Brereton in 1999 he joined 3AK now SEN 1116 and hosted a variety of programs. In 2005, Evans hosted Drive at 3MP. Greg has also worked on Melbourne talk-back radio station 3AW, guest hosting breakfast Sam Newman in 1992.

From 2009 until December 2012, Greg Evans presented a breakfast radio show on 3SR FM with local personality Mandy Turner in Shepparton. He moved to the Mansfield area in Victoria to be closer to his 97-year-old mother, and in November 2012 announced that he would be leaving 3SR to care for her.

Television 
He moved to television as a regular presenter on The Mike Walsh Show and in 1981 hosted the Network Ten series Together Tonight with Kerry Armstrong, then returned to radio in 1982 hosting a mid-morning show for 3MP for eighteen months. He returned to television as the host of Perfect Match Australia on Network Ten in 1983 The series became a surprise hit. In 1985 Evans made a cameo appearance in soap opera Prisoner, playing the role of "Celebrity". He hosted the talent show StarSearch on Network Ten between 1985 and 1986.

He also hosted the TV Week Logie Awards in 1985.

When Network Ten allowed his contract to expire in oversight in 1986 he was quickly signed by Nine but was warehoused by that network, hosting only mildly successful game shows Say G'Day and Crossfire for the network. After the Nine contract expired after two years he returned to Perfect Match Australia however by this stage its ratings were declining and it was cancelled in 1989. Evans hosted the show when it was revived in 1991 as Blind Date for Network Ten. He was later a co-host of Network Ten's afternoon talk show Monday To Friday. Evans continues his media duties and makes many guest appearances on various television shows.

TV & Radio work 
 3CS Colac Breakfast host (1971–1972)
 3CV Maryborough afternoon announcer (1972)
 2KA Katoomba Breakfast announcer
 3XY Drive Host
 3MP Morning Host
 Network Ten Together Tonight host (1982)
 Perfect Match Australia Host on Network Ten (1984–1986) (1989)
 Network Ten Star Search host (1985–1986)
 Nine Network Say G'Day host (1987)
 Nine Network Crossfire host (1987)
 3XY Drive host (1978–1983)
 3AW breakfast guest host with Sam Newman (1992)
 Gold 104.3 Drive host (1994–1996)
 Gold 104.3 Breakfast host with Dermott Brereton (1996–1998)
 Network Ten Monday To Friday host (1997)
 3AK Mornings (1999)
 3AK afternoon announcer (2001–2003)
 Nine Network Talking Real Estate host (2004)
 3MP Drive host (2005)
 3SR FM Shepparton breakfast host Solo (2009–2012) with Mandy Turner (2012–)
Greg also presented the Keno draw on GTV9 mainly week nights.

Awards and nominations

TV Week / Countdown Awards
Countdown was an Australian pop music TV series on national broadcaster ABC-TV from 1974 to 1987, it presented music awards from 1979 to 1987, initially in conjunction with magazine TV Week. The TV Week / Countdown Awards were a combination of popular-voted and peer-voted awards.

|-
| 1979
| himself
| Best Disc Jockey (Victoria)
| 
|-
| 1980
| himself
| Best Disc Jockey (Victoria)
| 
|-

Other work 
Evans also works as a Marriage celebrant and is a lifetime Australia Day ambassador. He is also an avid supporter of the Melbourne Football Club.

References 

1953 births
Living people
Australian radio personalities
Australian game show hosts
Radio personalities from Melbourne